Mohammad Sharif Ibrahim is the current commander of the Royal Brunei Air Force (RBAirF) since .  He became the first commanding officer of the Officer Cadet School (OCS), Defence Academy Royal Brunei Armed Forces (RBAF), programme manager at the Centre of Science and Technology Research and Development (CSTRAD), and the country's first defence attaché in Washington, D.C., United States.

Education
Throughout his career, Mohammad Sharif Ibrahim attended several institutes and training overseas including the Royal New Zealand Air Force (RNZAF) Junior Staff Course at the New Zealand Defence College, Upper Hutt in 2001, the Joint Services Command and Staff College, Shrivenham, United Kingdom in 2008, the National Defence College, New Delhi, India in 2014, and the Higher Defence Course in Spain in 2016.  From 2008 to 2014, he also obtained Master of Arts (MA) in Defence studies from King's College London, United Kingdom, and a Master of Philosophy (MPhil) in Defence and Strategic Studies from Madras University, Chennai, India.

Military career
In , he enlisted into the RBAirF and commissioned in February 1994, after finishing the Initial Officer Training at Royal Air Force College Cranwell, Cranwell, United Kingdom.  During his time in Cranwell, he attended basic flying training and multi-engine flying, which allowed him to fly the CASA/CN 235 transport aircraft.  In 1999, Mohammad Sharif went to Singapore to attend the Flying Instructor's Course, in return be able to instruct pilots in the CASA/CN-235 and Pilatus PC-7 Mk.II back in Brunei.

Mohammad Sharif was appointed as the Director of Intelligence in the Ministry of Defence on 19 March 2018, and later became the Joint Force Commander in the RBAF on 19 April 2019.  He succeeded Hamzah Sahat as the 15th commander of the RBAirF on 28 August 2020.  The handover ceremony between the two was held at Royal Brunei Air Force Base, Rimba, Bandar Seri Begawan.

During the Royal Brunei Air Force's 55th anniversary ceremony parade at the Air Movement Centre (AMC), Royal Brunei Air Force Base, Rimba, on 24 June 2021, he made a statement to Borneo Bulletin,

Mohammad Sharif oversaw the decommissioning of the RBAirF No. 1 Squadron's entire Bolkow BO105 helicopter fleet after 41 years of service.  The retirement ceremony was held at the Air Movement Centre (AMC), Royal Brunei Air Force Base, Rimba on 5 February 2022.

Personal life
Mohammad Sharif is married to Noraidah binti Haji Ibrahim, and together they have two children.  In addition, he enjoys running and cycling.

Honours

National

 :
  — Order of Pahlawan Negara Brunei First Class (PSPNB) – Dato Seri Pahlawan, 15 July 2019
  — Order of Setia Negara Brunei Fourth Class (PSB)
  — Order of Seri Paduka Mahkota Brunei Third Class (SMB) – 19 August 2017
  — Medal for Service to State (PIKB)
  — Golden Jubilee Medal – 5 October 2017
  — General Service Medal (Armed Forces)
  — Royal Brunei Armed Forces Golden Jubilee Medal – 31 May 2011

Foreign
 , :
  — Pingat Jasa Gemilang (Tentera) (PJG) (Meritorious Service Medal (Military) [MSM(M)]) – 11 May 2022
 RSAF Honorary Wings – 11 May 2022

References

Year of birth missing (living people)
Living people
Bruneian military leaders
Royal Brunei Air Force officers
Graduates of the Royal Air Force College Cranwell
Alumni of King's College London
National Defence College, India alumni